The Four may refer to:
Glasgow Four, the four prominent leaders of the Glasgow School
Four (comics), a group of fictional comic book supervillains from the series Planetary
The Four (Forgotten Realms), adventurers from the Forgotten Realms fantasy setting
The Four: Battle for Stardom, an American reality television music competition show

Works based on Woon Swee Oan's novel
Titles named "The Four" based on Woon Swee Oan's novel "The Four Great Constables" (四大名捕) include:
The Four (2008 TV series), a Hong Kong television series
The Four (film), a 2012 Chinese film
The Four II, a 2013 Chinese film
The Four III, a 2014 Chinese film
The Four (2015 TV series), a Chinese television series

See also
Four (disambiguation)